Edinburgh University Men's Hockey Club is the official men's hockey club for The University of Edinburgh. It currently comprises eight men's teams, which makes it the largest men's university field hockey and sports club in the United Kingdom, with over 190 active members.

Each team plays in regional Saturday league matches across eastern districts of Scotland and the top teams play in the national leagues and central leagues. The 1XI - 7XI teams participate in extra leagues on a Wednesday afternoon, where they participate in their respective British Universities & Colleges Sport (BUCS) league, playing other universities in Scotland and across the UK.

Students who are given offers to study at the University of Edinburgh enjoy access to the best performance hockey programme for 18-22 year olds in Scotland, as the only men's club playing in BUCS Premier National. BUCS Premier National is ranked, overall, higher than the Scottish Hockey Premiership; Edinburgh University Men's Hockey Club is the only men's team from Scotland competing in it as of the 2022/23 Season.

Home games are played at Peffermill Playing Fields (also known as The Cauldron, Peffs, and the VK Peffermill Arena), which are water-based pitches located in southern Edinburgh. Training takes place at Peffermill on Monday and Thursday evenings for all teams. These pitches are of an international standard, giving players of all abilities within the club an opportunity to play their best hockey.

The hockey club has a vast range of abilities within the club from international players to people who have just started to play the sport. All are welcome and the aim of the club is to not only improve players' abilities within the sport but to also provide a worthwhile and competitive sport for players to play throughout their university experience.

The club is sponsored by Gibson & Kerr, and LPA_. The 1st XI are also sponsored exclusively by Artemis, and the 2nd XI are sponsored by Aldi.

The club's mottos are "Bleed Green" and "We are the Gamblers".

History

Origins and Early History (1901-2000) 
The first mention of Hockey at the university was in 1899 when a notice was published in the Student which read "Would those in favour of starting a Hockey Club in connection with the University kindly forward their names and addresses to the Secretary, Hockey Club, University PO?" One of these founding members was G.M.Melville who although was born in Ireland he was schooled in England and attended university in Scotland.

There is no further mention of the club until 1901 when pitches were secured at Craiglockhart and play commenced. On 18 November that year the University Hockey Club as represented that year at the meeting of clubs in Scotland when it was agreed to form a Scottish Hockey Association, making the club a founding member of the modern association. The first match was played against Dumbarton and it was lost with the rest of the season recording 11 played, won 4, lost 5 and drawn 2. By the end of the season a second XI was started and so the sport must have proved a success.

The club was admitted to the University Athletic Club (now the Sports Union) in 1902 when W. Sibbald Robertson was the captain and in that year no less than 5 University players were recorded internationalists. T.P Caverhill was one of these 5 and must have been especially good given his numerous mentions and was subsequently awarded blues. The 1905–1906 season was especially good when of the sixteen matches played, twelve were won, three drawn and only one lost. One member of this team was especially of note. Frank Fasson was a former internationalist rugby player and must have brought all his speed and fiery temperament to the Hockey pitch which he demonstrated one match when he took a dislike to his opposing number and slashed his stick against the man's shins. The next week Frank had a tooth ache and went to the dentist and much to his dismay found that his dentist consultant was none other than his previous opposing player. However the great sportsman Dr N.L. Stevenson took neither advantage nor a fee. It was Fasson who was playing later that season when Scotland secured the first Scottish victory when playing against the Welsh; the result was 3–1.

The best season in the club was recorded in 1908-1909 when the first XI was unbeaten and six of the squad were chosen to represent Scotland. It was around this time that toy rabbits first appeared in the team photos presumably as mascots of the club.

Like most sports the First World War halted hockey matches although the club was re-established for the 1919–1920 season. The remarkable growth in the Sport meant that in the following season five teams were fielded for the university. The club suffered a dry spell for victories until 1930-1931 when the competition for places on the teams was so great that an inter-society matches were organised. This successful season saw the first touring side to go down to English Universities and victories were recorded against both Durham and Manchester. It is also in this season that the Scottish Inter University Championship was first recorded which Edinburgh won which was followed the next season with the first successful tour to Ireland. This successful vein continued with the Scottish Championships residing with Edinburgh University until the 1938–1939 season, the last before the Second World War.

There was no shortage of matches to be found during the war this time with 20 matches recorded each season. It is the 1942–1943 season which saw the first incarnation of the Scottish university teams play the United Services with no less than six Edinburgh men in the team. Much of the success gained by the team was attributed to the brilliant E.Evans Anfom as club captain.

In the history up to 1959 the club recorded a total of 32 full internationalists and one (S.P Theobald) who represented Great Britain and between these players they recorded 183 international caps.

1980s (The Golden Period) 
In the 1980s, club won 16 collective and individual awards from the Edinburgh University Sports Union (5 of which were collective awards, 11 individual awards) include 3 back-to-back Club of the Year awards. With so many awards won by the club during this era, it is speculated that growth, development, the number of titles won, and club culture changed fundamentally during this period.  The impact of the 1980s is still seen within and around the club to this day. 

As early as the late 1990s, the club began singing 'The Gambler' by Kenny Rogers at club socials and at games. It is a tradition that is still upheld to this day, and the club and its members are known widely as 'The Gamblers'.

Recent History (2000-Present) 
During the 2004/05 season, the club's socials took place at The Crags bar near Pollock Halls of Residence. This continued until 2012.

In the 2011/12 season, the 1st XI finished in 8th place. Whilst in the 2012/13 season they finished 7th  In the British Universities & Colleges Sport the 1st XI compete in Scottish 1A, which they won in the 2011/12 season.

In the British Universities & Colleges Sport the 2nd XI won Scottish 2A during the 2011/12 season and so won promotion for the first time to Scottish 1A since the leagues were re-organised in 2003. They finished the 2012/13 BUCS 1A season in 3rd place.

2012/13 Season 
The 2012/13 season was a pivotal season for the club. Then player-coach Graham Moodie stepped up to coach the 1XI full time, becoming the club's Head of Performance. During his near decade spell at the club, he led the team several Scottish Cup Finals, winning BUCS leagues, cups, and promotions, and professionalised the higher end of the club as one of the most dominating sides, not just within Scottish university hockey, but Scottish hockey as a whole. Moodie stepped down from his position in August 2021, Scottish International Hamish Imrie has since taken up the role as Head of Performance.

The club moved its bi-weekly socials to Malones Bar (later McSorleys) on Forrest Road, Edinburgh, and is widely recognised as the modern home of the EUHC socials scene, with hundreds of match teas and official socials taking place there.

It was also in the 2012/13 season that saw the beginning of Edinburgh Fives and Exeter Fives. Members of the club welcomed a fresher from University of Exeter Hockey Club to Edinburgh in December 2012 as part of Edinburgh Fives. The return journey (Exeter Fives) was held the following February, so forth starting the long social tradition that is still upheld to this day. Exeter University Men's Hockey Club and Edinburgh University Men's Hockey Club maintain close ties to this day alongside Edinburgh Fives and Exeter Fives. Both clubs are the largest men's university hockey clubs in their respective home nations (Edinburgh in Scotland; Exeter in England), both play in green at home, both share the motto "Bleed Green", and both club names can be abbreviated to "EUMHC".

2019/20 Season 
At the end of the 2019/20 season, then Director of Hockey at Edinburgh University, Eugene Connolly, who spent many years at the club developing coaches, umpires, and growing the size and image of the club, retired. Along with Dennis Hay, Connolly is often regarded as a mentor and father of hockey at Edinburgh University. The Director of Hockey position was removed and replace with Head of Hockey Development, a role which has since been taken up by Scotland Women's over 55s coach, Janice Hudson-Windsor. The season ended prematurely in March 2020 due to the COVID-19 Pandemic which cancelled annual events on and off the pitch such as Varsity, Exeter Fives, Hockey Ball, and Tour.

2020/21 Season 
The 2020/21 Season was effectively cancelled due to the COVID-19 Pandemic. Training in a limited capacity took place from September 2020 until December 2020. The Scottish and UK Government's second lockdown enforcement in January 2021 cancelled all forms of indoor and outdoor play until the end of March 2021. The club's social scene was rendered non-existent for the entire season, again cancelling major traditions such as Exeter Fives, Hockey Ball, and the club Tour that weren't hosted during the previous season either. The club maintained it's administrative and committee structure during the pandemic

2021/22 Season (The Golden Season) 
As of the beginning of the 2021/22 season, the club bolstered a membership number of over 190, making it the largest men's university sports club in the United Kingdom. The 1XI, with the support of Edinburgh University's Performance Sport Programme, continued to dominate Scottish Hockey. With high finishes in both the Scottish Hockey Premiership and the Scottish Cup, the 1XI continued to be one of the only men's university hockey club in the UK to actively compete for EHL qualification.

Scottish Internationalist Hamish Imrie joined the club as the 1st XI's player-coach and Head of Performance.

In the first half of the season, the 1st XI developed and honed a new field hockey strategy known as 'The Lobster Theory', which draws the comparison of specific defensive and offensive plays, as well as player mentality, with that of the cooking and preparation of lobster for consumption. The expanded details of the strategy are a closely guarded secret within the club, and was used sparingly throughout the season. Unconfirmed reports suggest that 'The Lobster Theory' has a 100% win efficiency, and is attributed to the many successes of the 1st XI during the 21/22 Season.

In the 2021/22, the club secured several titles after a return to play due to the COVID-19 Pandemic. In March 2022, the 2nd XI (Bill's Angels) led by captain Jack Cahalin won BUCS Scotland 1 in their final BUCS game of the season against Glasgow University, 3–1, in which they needed to win their game to win the league.

The 3rd XI led by captain Ted Porter made history after winning the BUCS Scottish Conference Cup, 3-3 (3-2), against Edinburgh Napier in St Andrews. The 3rd XI were down 3-1 with 6 minutes remaining in the final quarter. Former captain Harry Heap lobbed a ball past the keeper with 4 minutes remaining. In the final minute of the game, a head height 'Brexit ball' was hit into the circle which was deflect by the club's Social Secretary, Sonny Erskine, into the roof of the net which ended the game at 3-3. The goal has been described by spectators from both sides as 'the greatest goal ever scored in a game of hockey'. The game was won by club Treasurer and incoming President, Alex Johnson, who saved the final penalty flick to win the Scottish Cup and BUCS Championship. A club quote surrounding the win goes, "Ewen Mackie had a dream, but Ben Pearson and Matt White made that dream come true", in reference to 3rd XI's former and current coaches.  

Later on in March 2022, the 1st XI won the BUCS National Vase at BUCS Big Wednesday in the final against University of Birmingham Hockey Club Men's 1st XI, with the full time score at 1–0. 1st XI Captain Robbie Croll scored the single goal of the match. It ended the 1st XI's silverware drought which had persisted since they won the BUCS Hockey Trophy during the 17/18 season. The day is often described as, "it's a dangerous day to be a pint".

On the same day, the 3rd XI won BUCS Scotland 2 in their final BUCS game of the season. 

In April 2022, the 5th XI won East District 1. This was an incredible achievement for the team and the club as they team was almost completely new and restructured at the start of the season, and the team had been new promoted to the league.

In February 2022, the 1st XI finished 2nd place in BUCS Premier North, behind University of Nottingham Hockey Club Men's 2nd XI. Due to the BUCS Regulations on promotion within the Premier leagues, the 1st XI were entered into the BUCS Premier National Playoffs in order to contest promotion. BUCS Premier National, since the formation of BUCS in 2008, is the highest competitive league for men's hockey in the United Kingdom. There has never been a Scottish men's side qualify for BUCS Premier National. In April 2022, the 1st XI lost their first opportunity at promotion when they lost 2-2 (1-4) against University of Oxford Men's 1st XI. Their final chance at promotion was left to their last playoff game against Oxford Brookes University Men's 1st XI at Peffermill. The 1st XI secured the victory, winning 4–1, and securing promotion to the top flight of BUCS Men's Hockey for the first time as a Scottish men's team.At the end of April 2022, the 2nd XI (Bill's Angels) won the Scottish Men's Regional League, the highest competitive men's league in Scotland for non-first teams. Their title win came down to their final game of the season that was left in a tight tie breaker between 1st, 2nd, and 3rd place. 
The 2nd XI and 3rd XI finished off the season with two club trebles, when the 2nd XI won the Scottish Men's District Cup and the 3rd XI won the Scottish Men's Reserve Cup. These games ended the club's golden season with three confirmed promotions and eight titles for the club. 

2nd XI Coach, Bill Robson, retired from his role as the most decorated coach in club history, with 5 trophies over the course of 5 seasons, 2 of which were disregarded due to the COVID-19 Pandemic. 

To date, the 2021/22 season is the most successful season the club, as a whole, has ever had.

2022/23 Season 

The club expanded it number of teams from seven to eight.

The 3rd XI were promoted to BUCS Scotland 1 from the previous season, marking the first time a third team has competed at that level. They also secured a place in the Scottish Hockey Regional 1 league after a strong league placement the previous season and restructuring of the league systems. This placement made them the highest competing 3rd XI team in Scottish men's hockey.

The 7th XI were entered into the BUCS system for the 2022/23 Season. Their entry made the club the joint largest men's university sports clubs in the United Kingdom by their number of competitive BUCS teams - along with the University of Nottingham Hockey Club and the University of Exeter Hockey Club, both of whom enter their 7th XI's in the same season.

The club moved it's bi-weekly social scene to Dropkick Murphy's.

As the season began, Peffermill was coined with the nickname, "The Cauldron", by Scotland Internationalist and former 1st XI Captain Robbie Croll.

In early October 2022, the 1st XI drew 2-2 against the reigning BUCS Premier National winners and BUCS Championship champions, Loughborough Students Hockey Club 1st XI at The Cauldron in BUCS Premier National.

The club was shortlisted for a record 4 awards at the Edinburgh University Sports Union Sports Ball 2023. These awards were based on the previous season and included Club of the Year, Team of the Year (3rd XI), Male Athlete of the Year (Robbie Croll), and best Club Publicity Record of the Year. Despite the successes of the previous season, the club failed to win any awards in one of the biggest upsets in club history. 

Bill's Angels successfully defended their BUCS Scotland 1 title after a decisive victory against Strathclyde 1s at The Cauldron. 

The 1st XI successfully achieved back-to-back BUCS Big Wednesday appearences after their victory against Exeter University Hockey Club 2nd XI at The Nandos in Exeter. The fulltime score was 2-2 after Robbie Croll and Alex Wilson both scored. The game was won in a series of penalty strokes after goalkeeper Charlie Gates saved a penalty to allow the 1st XI to win 5-3 on penalties .

Current Situation
For the 2022/23 season:
The 1st XI are currently coached by Scotland International and Player-coach Hamish Imrie. They currently compete in the Scottish Hockey Premiership, and BUCS Premier National after promotion from BUCS Premier North in the 21/22 season.
 The 2nd XI are currently coached by former clubman and Player-coach Ewen Mackie, and play in the Scottish Regional League 1, and BUCS Scotland 1.
 The 3rd XI play in the Scottish Regional League 1, and BUCS Scotland 1. They are coached by 1st XI player, Scott Lindsay.
The 4th XI play in the Scottish Regional League 2, and BUCS Scotland 3. They are coached by 1st XI players, Jack Cahalin and Cammie Robson.
The 5th XI play in the Scottish Hockey East District 1, and BUCS Scotland 3. They are coached by 1st XI players, Tom Cahalin and James Pitchford.
The 6th XI play in the Scottish Hockey East District 2, and BUCS Scotland 4. They are coached by 2nd XI player, Ed Bury.
The 7th XI play in the Scottish Hockey East District 3, and BUCS Scotland 4. They are coached by 2nd XI players, Flo Garland Hoff and Ali Heading.
The 8th XI are a development squad for introducing beginners to competitive hockey. They are coached by 3rd XI player, Jamie Lawson.

Current and Former International Representatives
The following list are players who have represented their country and level during their time as members of Edinburgh University Men's Hockey Club, or represented shortly after leaving the club.

Committee 
The club is run by the Committee, which is elected every year from existing members. The day-to-day operations are handled by the committee with the support of persistent staff members employed by the club and the university.

Fixtures was split into two roles from the 2019/20 season - National League & BUCS Fixtures and East District Fixtures.

Website and Publicity were combined into one role from the 2019/20 season. In the 2022/23 season, the role was split again to accommodate the growing demands of the role and the club.

The 2022/23 Season saw three new positions - Welfare, Scholar Representative, and Goalkeeper Representative - added to the committee as well as the introduction of an 8XI captain to take over the newly formed 8XI team.

After two extremely tough seasons for Vice Presidents, Jack Mead and Callum Alexander, following the COVID-19 Pandemic, it was decided the role's responsibilities were to be reviewed. The full responsibility for umpire assignments and development was passed to a new Head of Umpiring position created for the 2023/24 season, allowing future Vice Presidents to focus more on general club management.

Notable Clubmen

Blues Recipients 
Awarded by the Sports Union to the University's top sportsmen and those who have performed to a consistently high level for Edinburgh University Men's Hockey Club.

Colours Recipients 
Clubmen awarded Sporting Colours by the Edinburgh University Sports Union for outstanding service to Edinburgh University Men's Hockey Club. 
Note from the 2022/23 season onwards, Sports Union criteria for Colours focused heavily on exceptional performance in service roles rather than length or position of service, making reception of Colours more difficult.

Honours

Club Awards 
The Club Awards are awarded internally at the club's annual end of season Hockey Ball.

Exeter Fives 

 Max Abbot (February 2013) [First Exeter Fives]
 Fergus Clarke (March 2018)
 James Allen (March 2019)
 Dax Traill (October 2021) [Exeter Fives cancelled in the 19/20 and 20/21 season due to the COVID-19 Pandemic, end destination was Bristol and played between 2nd & 3rd year club members]
 Harvey Homer (March 2022)
 Tomas Turjanica (January 2023) [10th Anniversary]

Club Songs & Chants 
"The Gambler" by Kenny Rogerssee The GamblerBen Pearson is the best on Earth (2022) - Heaven is a place on EarthOh uni, do you know what it's worth,

Ben Pearson is the best on Earth,

The silky Scotsman is just who we need,

He won BUCS Gold for Edinburgh Threes,

Na na na na, na na na na na,

na na na na ,na na na na na

See also
 
 Graham Moodie
 Dennis Hay
 Scottish Hockey
British Universities and Colleges Sport

References 
The story of Edinburgh University Athletic Club edited by Colonel C.M.Usher. Published in 1966.

External links
 Men's Club Official Site

Clubs and societies of the University of Edinburgh
Field hockey clubs established in 1901
1901 establishments in Scotland
University and college sports clubs in Scotland
Scottish field hockey clubs
University and college field hockey clubs in the United Kingdom